Weldon Odell Stautzenberger (October 23, 1924 – May 5, 2002) was an American football offensive guard who played one season in the All-America Football Conference (AAFC) for the Buffalo Bills. He was drafted in the 27th round of the 1947 NFL Draft by the Boston Yanks and was also a member of the Cleveland Browns. He appeared in nine games during the 1949 season, starting six. He died on May 5, 2002.

References

American football guards
Buffalo Bills (AAFC) players
1924 births
2002 deaths
Players of American football from Texas